Aubrey Pleasant is an American football coach  who is the defensive backs coach and passing game coordinator for the Los Angeles Rams of the National Football League (NFL). He played college football at Wisconsin and was previously an assistant coach for the Los Angeles Rams and Detroit Lions.

Early life 
Pleasant grew up in Flint, Michigan, where he attended Montrose High School and earned all-city running back honors as a sophomore. He graduated from Montrose Community Schools after receiving Class B all-state honorable mention at safety his senior year.

College football career 
Pleasant was a 3-star recruit coming out of high school and committed to the University of Wisconsin, where he was a 3-year letterman from 2005 to 2008, with 41 career appearances and 14 starts at safety. He finished his college career with 80 tackles, 2 sacks, 1 forced fumble and an appearance in 4 consecutive bowl games: the 2006 and 2007 Capital One Bowls, the 2008 Outback Bowl and the 2009 Champs Sports Bowl. Pleasant earned a bachelor's degree in sociology from Wisconsin in 2009 and his master's in education while coaching at Michigan.

Coaching career

Grand Blanc High School
Pleasant began coaching at Grand Blanc High School. He worked mostly with the defensive backs and was a behavioral specialist and special needs teacher in the Flint Community School District.

Michigan
He was then hired by the University of Michigan as a graduate assistant and worked mainly with the defensive backs, where they allowed 190.5 yards per game and 17.4 points per game, making them 16th and 6th in the nation, respectively. The defense allowed only 12 touchdown passes and led the Big Ten with 29 takeaways as well as 20 fumble recoveries, which tied for first in the FBS. Pleasant was promoted to assistant defensive backs coach the following year, where the Wolverines' defense improved to 13th and 5th following the 2012 season.

Cleveland Browns
He was hired by the Cleveland Browns as an offensive staff and head coaching intern during training camp.

Washington Redskins
Following training camp, he was hired as an offensive assistant by the Washington Redskins and promoted to defensive quality control coach the following year. He assisted defensive backs coach Raheem Morris with the development of rookie Bashaud Breeland, who went on to tie for the rookie lead in passes defensed with 14. The following year, Perry Fewell replaced Morris as DB's coach, where he and Pleasant helped with the transition of DeAngelo Hall and developments of rookies Quinton Dunbar and Kyshoen Jarrett.

Los Angeles Rams
Following the 2016 season, he was hired by the Los Angeles Rams as their cornerbacks coach, where he worked closely with defensive coordinator Wade Phillips in implementing the defensive scheme in LA. As cornerbacks coach for the Rams, 5 different cornerbacks have recorded at least 2 interceptions in a season, including Marcus Peters, Troy Hill and Darious Williams in 2018, where the Rams went on to participate in Super Bowl LIII.

Detroit Lions
The Detroit Lions hired Pleasant as pass game coordinator/defensive backs coach on January 28, 2021. Pleasant was fired by the Lions on October 31, 2022.

Green Bay Packers
After being fired by the Lions, Pleasant was hired by the Green Bay Packers as an offensive consultant, in order to give head coach Matt LaFleur defensive perspectives.

Los Angeles Rams (second stint) 
On February 16, 2023, Pleasant was hired by the Los Angeles Rams as defensive backs coach and passing game coordinator.

References

Living people
Detroit Lions coaches
Sportspeople from Flint, Michigan
Wisconsin Badgers football players
Year of birth missing (living people)